Straumsnes or Strømsnes is a village in the municipality of Fauske in Nordland county, Norway. It is located in the Valnesfjord area of Fauske. The village sits just inland of Skjerstad Fjord, along the southern shore of the lake Valnesfjordvatnet.

Valnesfjord Church is located on the southern side of the village area.

References

Fauske
Villages in Nordland
Populated places of Arctic Norway

no:Valnesfjord
nn:Valnesfjord